Jewell School is a public school in Jewell, Oregon, United States. It is the only school in the Jewell School District. The school has a Seaside mailing address because Jewell no longer has a post office. For the 2008–2009 school year, Jewell School received $3.1 million in timber dollars (nearly ten times the revenue from taxes).

In 1969 it had 24 high school students, making it, along with the high school of Ukiah, the high school programs in the state with the lowest enrollments.

Academics
In 2008, 63% of the school's seniors received a high school diploma. Of eight students, five graduated and three dropped out.

References

Public middle schools in Oregon
High schools in Columbia County, Oregon
Public high schools in Oregon
Public elementary schools in Oregon